The 1934 Maryland Terrapins football team was an American football team that represented the University of Maryland in the Southern Conference during the 1934 college football season. In their 24th and final season under head coach Curley Byrd, the Terrapins compiled a 7–3 record (3–1 in conference), finished in a tie for third place in the Southern Conference, and outscored their opponents by a total of 143 to 39. Coach Byrd went on to serve as the president of the University of Maryland from 1936 to 1954.

Schedule

References

Maryland
Maryland Terrapins football seasons
Maryland Terrapins football